Edmond Aram Kazasyan, best known as Vili Kazasyan, (8 December 1934 – 12 July 2008) was a Bulgarian jazz musician, composer, conductor and pianist from Armenian descent. He is the father of singer Hilda Kazasyan.

Life

Kazasyan graduated from VMEI (the predecessor of the Technical University of Sofia) in 1957 prior to turning to music. His debut as a musician and a composer was in the 1950s – as a pianist in "Jazz of the Youth" (Bulgarian: Джаза на младите).

He was also among the initiators of the "Golden Orphey" festival (Bulgarian: фестивала "Златният Орфей").

Kazasyan has received numerous awards, including the "Sirak Skitnik" (Bulgarian: Сирак Скитник) distinction in 2005 for his general contributions to the BNR of whose big band he had been in charge for more than 30 years. In the period from 1998 to 2008 the Big Band of Vili Kazasyan was produced by the producer Dobromir Slavchev.

Memory 

On 8 December 2019, the first official biography of the maestro of Ciela Publishing House was published with the title: "To love Villy Kazasyan" by the writer and producer Dobromir Slavchev. The book provides, in addition to the data known until then, completely new information and facts about the life and creative path of the conductor of the Big Band of the Bulgarian National Radio, and manages to bring fullness to the long career of maestro Vili Kazasyan.

References

External links
 "To love Vili Kazasyan" by Dobromir Slavchev – YouTube BNR
"To love Vili Kazasyan" by Dobromir Slavchev – YouTube BNT
"To love Vili Kazasyan" – Dobromir Slavchev in "The Hour of the Spectators" – BNT – YouTube BNT

Bulgarian musicians
Bulgarian composers
Bulgarian pianists
Bulgarian people of Armenian descent
1934 births
Musicians from Sofia
2008 deaths
20th-century pianists